Events from the year 1967 in art.

Events
 May 14 – Dedication of Liverpool Metropolitan Cathedral in England, designed by Frederick Gibberd, with stained glass by John Piper, Patrick Reyntiens and Margaret Traherne and a bronze crucifix by Elisabeth Frink.
 September 25 – Gilbert and George first meet while studying sculpture at St Martins School of Art in London.
 December 17 – 1967 Basel Picasso paintings purchase referendum: The people of Basel (Switzerland) vote to purchase two paintings by Picasso to retain them in the Kunstmuseum Basel.
 John Willett publishes Art in a City, a pioneering sociological study of art in a single city, Liverpool.
 Foundation of the Project Arts Centre, Dublin.
 The Maruki Gallery for the Hiroshima Panels is established in Higashimatsuyama, Saitama, Japan, as a permanent home for The Hiroshima Panels.

Awards

Exhibitions
 February 28–May 7 – New Documents photography exhibition at the Museum of Modern Art, New York curated by John Szarkowski and featuring the work of Diane Arbus, Lee Friedlander and Garry Winogrand.
 September–October – Im Spazio ("The Space of Thoughts") at the Galleria La Bertesca, Genoa, Italy, curated by Germano Celant and introducing Arte Povera.

Works

 Diane Arbus – Identical Twins, Roselle, New Jersey, 1967 (photograph)
 Francis Bacon – Portrait of Isabel Rawsthorne Standing in a Street in Soho
 Sargis Baghdasaryan – We Are Our Mountains (sculpture)
 Max Bill – Rhythm in Space (sculpture)
 Peter Blake with Jann Haworth – Sgt. Pepper's Lonely Hearts Club Band (collage for record album cover)
 Salvador Dalí – Tuna Fishing
 Edward Delaney – Wolfe Tone (bronze statue)
 Jose de Rivera – Infinity (sculpture)
 Dušan Džamonja – Monument to the Revolution of the people of Moslavina
 Milton Glaser – Dylan (poster)
 Barbara Hepworth – Two Forms (Orkney) (slate sculpture)
 Eila Hiltunen – Sibelius Monument (Helsinki)
 David Hockney – A Bigger Splash
 Richard Long – A Line Made by Walking (land art)
 Timothy Malone – Corten Steel Sculpture
 Joan Miró – The Caress of a Bird (sculpture)
 Henry Moore – sculptures
 Nuclear Energy
 Two-Piece Reclining Figure No. 9
 Barnett Newman – Voice of Fire
 Isamu Noguchi – Sinai (sculpture)
 Pablo Picasso – Chicago Picasso (sculpture)
 Michelangelo Pistoletto – Muretto di straci ("Rag Wall", assemblage)
 Faith Ringgold – The American People Series #18: The Flag is Bleeding
 Faith Ringgold – The American People Series #20: Die
 Norman Rockwell – Russian Schoolroom
 Kenneth Snelson – Six Number Two (sculpture)
 Mark di Suvero – Are Years What? (for Marianne Moore) (sculpture)
 Yevgeny Vuchetich – The Motherland Calls (sculpture)
 Andy Warhol
 Big Electric Chair
 I, a Man (film)
 James Wines – Three Bronze Discs (sculpture)
 David Wynne – Bird Fountains (Ambassador College, Pasadena, California)

Births
 January 1 – Spencer Tunick, American photographer
 March 4 – Sam Taylor-Johnson, born Samantha Taylor-Wood, English-born film director, photographer and visual artist
March 10 – Tim Pitsiulak, Inuk artist
 December 15 – David Černý, sculptor associated with Prague
 date unknown
 Olafur Eliasson, Danish-Icelandic installation artist
 Andy Taylor, Australian painter and printmaker

Deaths
 January 8 – Josef Frank, Austrian-born Swedish architect and designer (born 1885)
 January 10 – Charles E. Burchfield, American landscape watercolorist (born 1893)
 January 15 – David Burliuk, Russian avant-garde artists (born 1882)
 January 28 – Ary Stillman, Russian-American representational and abstract painter (born 1891)
 January 31 – Oscar Fischinger, German born American animator, filmmaker and painter (born 1900)
 February 17 – Nancy Cox-McCormack, American portrait sculptor (born 1885)
 March 31 – Jefto Perić, Serbian painter (born 1895)
 May 15 - Edward Hopper, American painter and printmaker (born 1882)
May 15 – Jessie Traill, Australian printmaker (born 1881)
 May 27 – Johannes Itten, Swiss painter (born 1888)
 August 15 – René Magritte, Belgian surrealist painter (born 1898)
 August 30 – Ad Reinhardt, American abstract painter (born 1913)
 September 20 – Zinaida Serebriakova, Russian-born French painter (born 1884)
 November 21 – Vladimir Lebedev, Russian painter and graphic artist (born 1891)
 November 22 – Pavel Korin, Russian painter (born 1892)
 December 12 – Mac Raboy, American illustrator (born 1914)
 December 26 – Ambrose McCarthy Patterson, Australian painter and printmaker (born 1877)
 date unknown
 Marguerite Huré, French stained glass artist (born 1895)
 Veljko Stanojević, Serbian painter (born 1892)

See also
 1967 in fine arts of the Soviet Union

References

 
Years of the 20th century in art
1960s in art